Club Voleibol Aguere is a professional volleyball team  based in San Cristóbal de La Laguna, Spain. It plays in the Superliga Femenina de Voleibol.

History
The team was found in 1992.

In the 2009/2010 season the team achieve the League Championship for the first time.

Honours
Superliga Femenina (1)
2009–10
Copa de la Reina (0)
Runners-up: 2007

2013–14 season squad

References

External links
Official site
RFEVB Profile

Spanish volleyball clubs
Sport in Tenerife
Volleyball clubs established in 1992
Sports teams in the Canary Islands
1992 establishments in Spain